Beaulieu House, from the French for "beautiful place", may refer to:

in England
 The Palace of Beaulieu, Boreham, Essex, the surviving north wing of the Tudor structure now part of the Roman Catholic independent New Hall School

in Ireland
 Beaulieu House and Gardens, an early Georgian historic estate in County Louth; open to the public

in Singapore
 The Beaulieu House, in Sembawang Park

in the United States of America
 Beaulieu House, Newport, private former home of John Jacob Astor III, Cornelius Vanderbilt III and his wife Grace Vanderbilt

See also
 Beaulieu Palace House, in Hampshire, England
 Beaulieu (disambiguation)